Amt Ziesar is an Amt ("collective municipality") in the district of Potsdam-Mittelmark, in Brandenburg, Germany. Its seat is in Ziesar.

The Amt Ziesar consists of the following municipalities:
Buckautal
Görzke
Gräben
Wenzlow
Wollin
Ziesar

Demography

References 

Ziesar
Potsdam-Mittelmark